Wepper may refer to:

 Fritz Wepper (born 1941, Munich), a German television actor
 Sophie Wepper (born 1981), German actress, daughter of Fritz Wepper
 Elmar Wepper (born 1944, Augsburg), a German actor

References 

German-language surnames